Axaren is a lake in Stockholm County, Södermanland, Sweden.  It forms part of the Kagghamraåns sjösystem.

Lakes of Stockholm County